Scarlett is a feminine given name. The color scarlet symbolizes courage, passion, force, joy and heat. The cardinals of the Roman Catholic Church wear scarlet as a color of the blood of Christ and the Christian martyrs. It gained popularity due to the character Scarlett O'Hara in Margaret Mitchell's best-selling novel Gone with the Wind and the film adaptation. The name has been well used in recent years for girls in the United Kingdom and in the United States.

The name also has associations with the bright red color scarlet. Scarlett originated as an occupation surname, designating a person who sold scarlet, a luxury wool cloth produced in Medieval Europe.   The word is thought to derive from the Arabic siklāt, referring to silks dyed with kermes.

People named Scarlett
 Scarlett Bordeaux (born 1991), American professional wrestler
 Scarlett Estevez (born 2007), American actress
 Scarlett Johansson (born 1984), American actress
 Scarlett Alice Johnson (born 1985), English actress
 Scarlett Keegan (born 1984), American model and actress
 Scarlett Moffatt (born 1990), English television personality
 Scarlett Pomers (born 1988), American actress
 Scarlett Werner (born 1984), German tennis player
 Scarlett Westbrook (born 2004), British climate justice activist and journalist

Fictional characters
Scarlett (G.I. Joe), in the G.I. Joe universe
Scarlett, a gender swap of Will Scarlet, in Robin Hood: Mischief in Sherwood
Scarlett, in the e4 TV series Skins
 Scarlett, a character in the Canadian animated show Total Drama
 Scarlett Adams, Indonesian-English girl with strange powers from The Power of Five book series
 Scarlett Dragna, main character of the Caraval novels by Stephanie Garber
 Scarlett Fox, character from the National Wildlife Federation's Ranger Rick magazine
 Scarlett the Garnet Fairy, character in the Rainbow Magic book franchise
 Scarlett Kiernan, from the British soap opera Doctors
 Scarlett Nicholls, from the British ITV soap opera Emmerdale
 Scarlett O'Connor, a character in the US TV series Nashville
 Scarlett O'Phelan Godoy (born 1951), Peruvian historian and university professor
 Scarlett O'Hara, main character in the novel and film Gone with the Wind
 Scarlett O'Hara St. Jones, character in the movie Steamboy
 Scarlett Valentine, in the New Zealand soap opera Shortland Street

See also

References

English feminine given names
Feminine given names
English given names